Vengerovka is a rural locality (a selo) and the administrative center of Vengerovskoye Rural Settlement, Rakityansky District, Belgorod Oblast, Russia. The population was 829 as of 2010. There are 4 streets.

Geography 
Vengerovka is located 20 km northeast of Rakitnoye (the district's administrative centre) by road. Vyshniye Peny is the nearest rural locality.

References 

Rural localities in Rakityansky District